Omia is a district of the province of Rodríguez de Mendoza in Peru.
 
According to documentary sources, it was founded on February 5, 1875, from the District of Huayabamba, together with Totora, Pink Saint and San Nicolás.

External links
 Omia district official website 

Districts of the Rodríguez de Mendoza Province
Districts of the Amazonas Region